Veljo Käsper (13 May 1930 Tallinn – 16 March 1982 Tallinn) was an Estonian film director and scenarist.

In 1964 he graduated from Gerasimov Institute of Cinematography.

Since 1960 he worked at Tallinnfilm.

Filmography

 1974 "Dangerous Games" (feature film; director)
 1977 "A Time to Live and a Time to Love" (feature film; director)
 1979 "Strateegia ja reservid" (documental film; director and scenarist)
 1980 "Kutsumus" (documental film; director and scenarist)
 1981 "Pihlakaväravad" (feature film; director and scenarist)

References

1930 births
1982 deaths
Estonian film directors
Estonian screenwriters
People from Tallinn
Burials at Rahumäe Cemetery
20th-century screenwriters